Zócalo/Tenochtitlan metro station is a station of the Mexico City Metro in the historic center of the city, in the Cuauhtémoc borough. It is an underground station with two side platforms, served by Line 2 (the Blue Line). It lies between Allende and Pino Suárez metro stations. The station's pictogram features the coat of arms of Mexico and it receives its name from the Plaza de la Constitución, commonly known as Zócalo, Mexico City's main square located above the station. The station was opened on 14 September 1970, on the first day of the service Tasqueña–Tacuba.

The station facilities are partially accessible for people with disabilities as there is an elevator; there is an Internet café, an information desk, a cultural display, a mural titled Cenefas conmemorativas del Bicentenario, and a passageway that connects with Pino Suárez station, where there is a free mini-cinema and various bookstores. In 2019, the station had an average daily ridership of 71,613 passengers, making it the tenth busiest station in the network and the third busiest of the line. The station was formerly named Zócalo metro station until August 2021, when it was renamed to commemorate the 500th anniversary of the Fall of Tenochtitlan.

Location

Zócalo/Tenochtitlan is a metro station in the colonia (Mexican Spanish for "neighborhood") of Centro, otherwise known as the historic center of Mexico City. It is in the Cuauhtémoc borough and serves multiple landmarks, including Constitution Square (which is locally known as "Zócalo"), the National Palace, the Metropolitan Cathedral, and the archaeological remains of Tenochtitlan's main temple, Templo Mayor. Within the system, the station lies between Allende and Pino Suárez metro stations.

There are six exits. The first one is next to National Palace to the east, the second entrance is on the opposite side, serving Constitution Square; the third and fourth are on Pino Suárez Avenue, on the south side of the square but one is on Corregidora Street (next to the building of the Supreme Court of Justice of the Nation) on the southeast, while the other one is near the corner of Venustiano Carranza Street. The remaining exits serve the northern part of the square: one is next to the Metropolitan Cathedral, while the other is next to the National Palace near the corner of Moneda Street. The area is serviced by the Ecobici system.

Inside the station

Since 2009, there is a free Internet café, the first to be opened by the system. There is also an information desk and multiple murals titled Cenefas conmemorativas del Bicentenario (2010), by Juan Carlos Garcés Botello and Jesús Cristóbal Flores Carmona. There is also a cultural display managed by the National Institute of Anthropology and History, where the history of Constitution Square is illustrated with a scale model. The station has a corridor that connects with Pino Suárez station through an underground passageway on the south side, called Pasaje Zócalo–Pino Suárez. It was opened in 1997 and there are 42 bookstores and a free library and mini-cinema. Originally it was a passageway created to add another station named Salvador, but it was canceled due to the proximity of both stations.

History and construction
Line 2 of the Mexico City Metro was built by Ingeniería de Sistemas de Transportes Metropolitano, Electrometro and Cometro, the latter a subsidiary of Empresas ICA.

The station was opened on 14 September 1970, on the first day of the Tasqueña–Tacuba service; the facilities are partially accessible for people with disabilities as there is an elevator. In 1983, Zócalo was planned to be an interchange station connecting Line 2 with Line 8, which was proposed to run from Indios Verdes to Pantitlán. The project was canceled due to the lack of planning and the potential damage it would cause to historical buildings. The line was later modified to run from Garibaldi to Constitución de 1917 metro stations in a line that goes under Eje Central Avenue.

In December 2019, the turnstiles on the southern side were replaced with motion-sensor speed gates that avoid users from entering the station for free.

Name and pictogram
The pictogram represents the coat of arms of Mexico, which depicts an eagle perched on a prickly pear cactus devouring a snake. The station was named after the main square of Mexico City, Constitution Square. The term  originally means "base" in architecture. During the times of Antonio López de Santa Anna, it was planned to have a monument dedicated to the Mexican War of Independence at Constitution Square. The base was eventually buried and was uncovered until 2017. Because of that, zócalo has been used as a synonym for "square" or "plaza" in Mexican Spanish and its usage eventually spread throughout the country.

In August 2020, authorities of the system changed the signage at the station to "Zócalo/Tenochtitlan", and they announced the modifications would be formalized in a civic ceremony. The station was officially renamed on 13 August 2021 to coincide with the 500th anniversary of the Fall of Tenochtitlan, the capital of the Aztec Empire, and the civil ceremony that formalized it took place on 19 August, where Puente de Alvarado Avenue and the respective Metrobús station, named after Pedro de Alvarado, were also renamed to Calzada México-Tenochtitlan and México-Tenochtitlan station, respectively.

Incidents
On 29 March 1998, a drunk passenger started shooting at users, injuring a security guard who tried to stop him. Due to its location, Zócalo/Tenochtitlan station is commonly closed by the authorities. It has been closed due to national security concerns, the COVID-19 pandemic in Mexico, live events at Constitution Square, and protests in the zone. Demonstrators have vandalized the station multiple times.

Ridership
According to the data provided by the authorities, Zócalo/Tenochtitlan metro station has been one of the busiest stations of the system's 195 stations, where commuters averaged, between 2011 and 2021, between 17,500 and 72,900 daily entrances in the last decade. In 2019, before the impact of the COVID-19 pandemic on public transport, the station's ridership totaled 26,138,960 passengers, which was a decrease of 282,172 passengers compared to 2018. In the same year, it was the tenth busiest of the system and it was the line's third busiest.

Notes

References

External links

Pasaje Zócalo–Pino Suárez Official Website
 

1970 establishments in Mexico
Accessible Mexico City Metro stations
Historic center of Mexico City
Mexico City Metro Line 2 stations
Mexico City Metro stations in Cuauhtémoc, Mexico City
Railway stations located underground in Mexico
Railway stations opened in 1970